Jiming Bao is a Chinese physicist.

Bao studied physics at Zhejiang University, where he earned his bachelor's and master's degrees. He then completed a doctorate in applied physics at the University of Michigan. Bao teaches at the University of Houston. In 2018, Bao was elected a fellow of the Optical Society of America. In 2019, he was granted an equivalent honor by the American Physical Society, "[f]or the discovery of photoacoustic laser streaming, for seminal contributions to the understanding of basic electronic and optical properties of nanostructured materials, and the development of new nanomaterials for applications in solar energy conversions and optoelectronic devices."

References

Living people
Chinese expatriates in the United States
Fellows of the American Physical Society
Fellows of Optica (society)
University of Houston faculty
Zhejiang University alumni
University of Michigan alumni
21st-century Chinese physicists
20th-century Chinese physicists
Year of birth missing (living people)